Alun Hoddinott CBE (11 August 1929 – 11 March 2008) was a Welsh composer of classical music, one of the first to receive international recognition.

Life and works
Hoddinott was born in Bargoed, Glamorganshire, Wales. He was educated at Gowerton Grammar school before matriculating to University College, Cardiff, and later studied privately with Arthur Benjamin. His first major composition, the Clarinet Concerto, was performed at the Cheltenham Festival of 1954 by Gervase de Peyer with the Hallé Orchestra and Sir John Barbirolli.

This brought Hoddinott a national profile, which was followed by a string of commissions by leading orchestras and soloists. These commissions continued up to his death, and he was championed by some of the most distinguished singers and instrumentalists of the 20th century. These include singers such as Dame Margaret Price, Dame Gwyneth Jones, Sir Thomas Allen, Jill Gomez, Sir Geraint Evans and more recently Claire Booth, Helen Field, Gail Pearson and Jeremy Huw Williams. Instrumentalists have included Ruggiero Ricci, Mstislav Rostropovich, Dennis Brain, Osian Ellis, Cecil Aronowitz, Nia Harries, Roger Woodward and John Ogdon to name a few, and more recently euphonium player , cellist Kathryn Price, trombonist Mark Eager and song pianist Andrew Matthews-Owen.

Hoddinott was prolific, writing symphonies, sonatas, and concertos: his style evolved over a long and distinguished career, from the neo-classicism of the Clarinet Concerto to a brand of serialism which allowed a tonal framework to the structure, combining a penchant for dark textures and brooding harmonies similar to that of another British composer, Alan Rawsthorne, with Bartokian arch-forms and palindromes. However, his move into opera from 1970 helped to broaden his stylistic range and lighten his palette. His music often displays a brooding, darkly lyrical intensity, manifested in his nocturnal slow movements. One of the best examples is his rhapsodic Poem for violin and orchestra, inspired by a line from James Joyce, The Heaventree of Stars. Combining tough, disciplined writing with a sense of the mysterious and unknown, his musical style has been described as "modernist romantic".

Alun Hoddinott was also a gifted teacher and, as Professor of Music at University College, Cardiff, was responsible for the expansion of the Department of Music (with a purpose-built building) which became the largest in Europe in the 1980s. Hoddinott taught a number of talented composers during his time at Cardiff, including the Irish composer John Buckley and Welsh composers Karl Jenkins, Jeffrey Lewis, Gwyn Parry-Jones, John Metcalf and Christopher Painter.

He was awarded honorary doctorates from numerous leading musical institutions, including the Royal Academy of Music, the Royal Northern College of Music and the Royal Welsh College of Music & Drama, as well as the Walford Davies Award. He was appointed a Commander of the Order of the British Empire (CBE) in the 1983 New Year Honours.

In 2005, Hoddinott produced a fanfare to be performed at the wedding of Charles, Prince of Wales, to Camilla Parker Bowles, having previously written works to celebrate Prince Charles' 16th birthday and his investiture.

In 1997 Alun Hoddinott received the Glyndŵr Award for an Outstanding Contribution to the Arts in Wales during the Machynlleth Festival. He also received a Lifetime Achievement Award from the Arts Council of Wales in 1999, and Fellowship of the Welsh Music Guild.

On 1 March 2007 (Saint David's Day) soprano Helen Field and baritone Jeremy Huw Williams gave the world première of his orchestral song cycle Serenissima with the BBC National Orchestra of Wales at St David's Hall. It was announced on this occasion that the new home of the BBC National Orchestra of Wales in the Wales Millennium Centre in Cardiff would include a specially built 350-seat concert hall, named BBC Hoddinott Hall. The new hall was inaugurated with an opening festival held between 22 January and 1 February 2009, with live performances broadcast on BBC Radio 3. The opening piece was a show piece by Hoddinott himself. 

Alun Hoddinott died on 11 March 2008 at Morriston Hospital, Swansea, aged 78, the day after the world première at the Wigmore Hall of his Music for String Quartet, given by the Sacconi Quartet. His very last work, the orchestral tone poem "Taliesin", was premièred by the BBC National Orchestra of Wales at the Swansea Festival of Music in October 2009.

Chronological worklist
late 1940s two student string quartets
1948 Cello Concerto
1948 Prelude and fugue for string trio
1949 Nocturne for orchestra
1950 Op. 1 String Trio
 ? Op. 2 Two Songs for bass voice and piano
1953 Op. 3 Clarinet Concerto 1, +str
1954 Op. 4/1 Lullaby, voice and piano
1954 Op. 4/2 Fugal Overture
1953 Op. 5 Nocturne for Orchestra (first published work)
1953 Op. 6 Clarinet Quartet
1954-5 Op. 7 Symphony 1
1955 Op. 8 Concerto for Oboe and Strings
1956 Op. 9 Nocturne 1 for piano
1956 Op. 10 Septet for clarinet bassoon horn piano violin viola and cello
1957 Op. 11 Harp Concerto
1957 Op. 12 Rondo Scherzino for trumpet
1958 Op. 13 Serenade for String Orchestra
1958 Op. 14 Viola Concertino, for Cecil Aronowitz
1958 Op. 15 Welsh Dances Suite 1, orch
1959 Op. 16/1 Nocturne 2 for piano
1958 Op. 16/2 Prelude Nocturne & Dance for harp and strings
1958 Two Welsh Dances
1959 Op. 17 Piano Sonata 1
1959 Op. 18 Sonatina for clavichord
1959 Op. 18/3 Elegy for solo piano
1959 Op. 19 Piano Concerto 1, +wind orchestra and percussion
1960 Op. 20 Sextet
1960 Op. 21 Piano Concerto 2
1960 Op. 22 Violin Concerto 1
1960 Op. 23 The Race of Adam
1962 Op. 24 Job (Oratorio)
1963 Op. 25 no.3 Rondo Scherzo for orchestra
 ? Op. 26 Rebecca:A Ballad fir SATB choir
1961 Op. 27 Piano Sonata 2
1961 Op. 29 Symphony 2, for Alan Rawsthorne
1961 Op. 30 Christ and Sinful Man
1962 Op.  31 Variations for orchestra
1962 Folksong Suite, 4movts, orch
1962 Op. 32/1 Divertimento, ob cl hn bsn
1962 Op. 32/2 Anthem
1962 Op. 32/3 Introit
1962 Op. 33 Danegeld, SATB choir
1963 Op. 34 Sinfonia for strings
1964 Op. 35 Jack Straw Overture
1964 Op. 36 Harp Sonata
1964 Op. 37/1 Toccata alla giga for organ
1964 Op. 37/2 Intrada for organ
1964 Op. 37/3 Sarum Fanfare for organ
1964 Op. 38/1 What Tidings? SATB choir (text by John Audeley adapted by Jacqueline Froom)
1964 Op. 38/2 A Mediaeval Carol, medium voice and piano (text adapted by Jacqueline Froom)
1964 Op. 38/3 Four Welsh Songs, for unison voices and piano/ orchestra
1964 Op. 39 Dives & Lazarus, cantata, sop. bar vv orch
1964 Piano Sonatina
1965 Op. 40 Piano Sonata 3
1965 Op. 41 Concerto Grosso 1
1965 Op. 42 Aubade and Scherzo, horn and strings
1965 Op. 43 String Quartet 1
1966 Op. 44 Piano Concerto 3
1966 Op. 45 Overture 'Pantomime'
1966 Op. 46 Concerto Grosso 2, orch
1966 Op. 47 Variants, orch
1966 Op. 48 Night Music, orch
1966 Op. 49 Piano Sonata 4
1966 Severn Bridge Variation (1966, part of a composite work composed by Malcolm Arnold, Hoddinott, Nicholas Maw, Daniel Jones, Michael Tippett and Grace Williams)
1967 Op. 50 Clarinet Sonata
1967 Op. 51 Organ Concerto
1967 Op. 52 Suite for harp
1968 Op. 53 Noctures and Cadenzas, clarinet, violin and cello
1968 Op. 54 Roman Dream, voice and small ensemble
1968 Op. 55 An Apple Tree and a Pig
1968 Op. 56 Sinfonietta 1, orch
1968 Op. 57 Piano Sonata 5
1968 Op. 58 Divertimenti, fl cl bsn hn vln va vcl db
1968 Op. 59 Barti Ddu
1960 Op. 60 Fioriture (dedicated to Michael Tippett)
1968 Op. 61 Symphony 3
1968 Op. 62 Nocturnes & Cadenzas, vcl orch
1968 Op. 63 Violin Sonata 1
1969 Op. 64 Welsh Dances Suite 2, orch
1969 Op. 65/1 Horn Concerto
1969 Op. 65/2 Eryri, chorus and orch
1969 Op. 66 Investiture Dances, orch
1969 Op. 67 Sinfonietta 2, orch
1970 Op. 68 Fantasy for solo harp
1970 Op. 69 Divertimento for small orchestra
1970 Op. 70 Symphony 4
1970 Op. 71 Sinfonietta 3, orch
1970 Op. 72/1 Suite 1 for orchestra
1970 Op. 72/2 Concertino for horn, trumpet and orchestra
1971 Op. 72/3 Sinfonietta 4 for orchestra
1970 Op. 72/4 Aubade for small orchestra
1972 Op. 72/5 The Hawk Is Set Free for orchestra
1970 Op. 72/6 Floore of Heav'n for orchestra
1970 Op. 72/9 Concertino for Trumpet Horn & orchestra
1970 Op. 73/1 Violin Sonata 2
1970 Op. 73/2 Cello Sonata 1
1970 Op. 74 Motet: Out of the Deep
1970 Op. 76 The Sun the Great Luminary of the Universe, orch
1970 Op. 77 Piano Trio no. 1
1972 Op. 78/1 Violin Sonata 3
1972 Op. 78/2 Horn Sonata
1972 Op. 78/3 Piano Sonata 6
1972 Op. 78/4 Piano Quintet
1971 Op. 79 The Tree of Life, oratorio
1971 Op. 80 St. Paul at Malta, cantata
1973 Op. 81 Symphony 5
1974 Op. 82 Ancestor Worship
1974 Op. 83 The Beach of Falesa, 3-act opera
1974 Op. 84 The Silver Swimmer for SATB chorus and piano four hands
1974 Op. 85 Ritornelli for trombone wind & perc
1975 Op. 86/1 Landscapes, orchestra
1975 Op. 86/2 Nightpiece for orchestra
1975 Op. 87 5 Landscapes, Ynys Mon for ten & orch
1975 Op. 88 The Magician, 1-act opera
1976 Op. 89 Violin Sonata 4
1976 Op. 90 A Contemplation upon Flowers, sop.  orch
1976 Op. 91 French Suite, small orch
1977 Op. 92 Italian Suite for recorder and guitar
1976 Op. 93 What the Old Man Does is Always Right, 1-act opera
1977 Op. 94 Passagio, orch
1977 Op. 95 Sinfonia Fidei, sop. ten vv orch
1977 Op. 96/1 Cello Sonata 2
1977 Op. 96/2 Organ Sonata
1978 Op. 97/1 Dulci Iuventutis SATB & piano four hands
1978 Op. 97/2 Hymnus ante somnum
1978 Sonatina for two pianos
1979 Hymnus ante somnum
 ? Op. 99 The Rajah's Diamond, opera
1979 Op. 100/1 Scena, for string quartet
1979 Op. 100/2 Ritornelli 2, brass
1980 Op. 101/a Nocturnes and Cadenzas, for solo cello
1980 Op. 101/b Nocturnes and Cadenzas, for solo flute
1980 Op. 102 The Heaventree of Stars, poem, vln and orch
1981 Op. 103 The Trumpet Major, 3-act Hardy opera
1981 Op. 104/2a Sonata for 4 clarinets
1981 Op. 104/2b Sonata for 4 saxophones
1981 Op. 105/1 Te Deum
1981 Op. 105/2 Lanterne des Morts, orch
1982 Op. 106 Doubles, Concertante for ob str hpschd
1982 Op. 107/1 Five Studies for orchestra
1982 Op. 107/2 Hommage a Chopin for orchestra
1982 Quodlibet on Welsh Nursery Tunes for orchestra
1982 Six Welsh Folksongs for high voice and piano
1982 The Charge of the Light Brigade
1983 King of Glory for SATB chorus and organ
1983 Make A Joyful Noise for SATB chorus and organ
1983 Op. 108 Ingraviscentem aetatem
1983 Op. 109 Masks for oboe bassoon and piano
1983 Op. 110 Lady and Unicorn
1983 Op. 111 Piano Trio 2
1983 Op. 112 Bagatelles for oboe and harp
1983 Quodlibet on Welsh Nursery Tunes for brass
1984 in parasceve Domini : 3 Nocturno
1984 Lady And Unicorn for SATB chorus and piano
1984 Op. 113 String Quartet 2
1984 Op. 114 Piano Sonata 7
1984 Op. 115 Scenes and Interludes, concertante for trumpet, harpsichord and strings
1984 Op. 116 Symphony 6
1984 Op. 117 The Bells of Paradise
1984 Op. 118 Divertimenti
1984 Op. 119 Scena for strings
1984 Op. 120 Sonata for 2 pianos
1985 Christ Is Risen
1985 Sing A New Song for SSAATB chorus and organ
1985 Op. 121 The Silver Hound for tenor and piano
1985 Op. 122 Prelude & Fugue, for organ
1985 Op. 123 Welsh Dances Suite 3
1985 Op. 124 Concerto for Piano Trio and Orchestra
1986 Op. 125 Piano Sonata 8
1986 Op. 126 Diversions
1986 Op. 127 Concerto for Orchestra
1986 Op. 128 Clarinet Concerto 2
1987 Op. 129 The Legend of St Julian, narrator, chorus and orch
1989 Op. 130 String Quartet 3
1989 Op. 131 Lines From Marlowe Doctor Faustus for SATB chorus brass percussion
1989 Op. 132 Noctis Equi, vcl orch
1989 Op. 133 Songs of Exile, ten & orchestra
1989 Op. 134 Piano Sonata 9
1989 Op. 135 Star Children, orch
1989 Op. 136 Piano Sonata 10
1989 Op. 137 Symphony 7, Organ Symphony
1989 Op. 138 Emynau Pantycelyn
 ? Op. 139 Novelette, for flute oboe and piano
1989 Op. 140 Flute Sonata
1989 Op. 141 Violin Sonata 5
1989 Op. 142 Symphony 8, for Brass & Percussion
2001 Op. 143/1 Paradwys Mai, baritone and piano
1992 Op.144 Chorales, Variants and Fanfares, for brass quintet
1990 Hymns of Pantycelyn, cantata
1992 Op.145 Symphony No.9 'Vision of Eternity' for soprano and orchestra
1993 Op. 146 Wind Quintet
1994 Sonata notturno
1995 Spectrum 1: Dark March, pno
1993 Op. 147 Piano Sonata 11
1993 Op. 148 Missa Sancti David
1993 Op. 149 Piano Sonata 12
1993 Op. 150 Six Bagatelles
1994 Op. 151/1 3 Hymns
1994 Op. 151/2 3 Shakespeare Songs
1994 Op. 152/1 The Silver Swimmer, soprano and ensemble
1994 Op. 152/2 Five Poems of Gustavo Adolfo Becquer translated from the Spanish by Ifan Payne
1994 Op. 153 Violin Concerto No.2
1995 Op. 154 Trumpet Concerto (The Shining Pyramid), written for Gareth Small and premiered at St David's Hall, Cardiff, on the last night of the Welsh Proms in 1995.
1995 Op. 155 Tymhorau for voice and piano or voice and strings (1996)
1995 Op. 156 Poetry on Earth
1995 Op. 157 Oboe and Harp Sonata
1996 Op. 158 Mass of Camargue for baritone, choir, piano duet, organ and percussion
1996 Op. 159 Cello Sonata 3
1997 Spectrum 2: Lizard, pno
 ? Op. 160 String Quartet 4
 ? Op. 161 Piano Trio 3
1996 Op. 162 Clarinet Sonata 2
 ? Op. 163 Violin Sonata 6
1997 Op. 164 Harp Sonata
1997 Op. 165 Poetry of Earth for voice and harp
1997 Op. 166/1 Island of Dreams, for solo cello
1997 Op. 166/2 Lizard, for solo treble recorder
1998 Op. 167 Dragon Fire
1998 Op. 168 Grongar Hill, a setting of sections from John Dyer's poem for baritone and piano quintet
1999 Op. 169 Celebration Dances for Orchestra
1999 Op. 170 Tower, final Op. era
1999 Op. 171 To the Poet, bass-baritone and piano
1999 Op. 172 Symphony 10
2000 Op. 173 La Serenissima for baritone and piano
 ? Op. 174 Doubles, quintet for oboe, piano and string trio
 ? Op. 175 Concerto for percussion and brass band
 ? Op. 176 Piano Sonata 13
 ? Op. 177 String Quartet 5
 ? Op. 178 Dream Wanderer
 ? Op. 179 Bagatelles, for 11 instruments
2002 Op. 180 Euphonium Concerto, The Sunne Rising, The King will Ride
2003 Op. 181 Lizard: Concerto for orchestra
 ? Op. 182 Euphonium Sonata
2004 Op. 183 The Promontory of Dreams for baritone, horn and strings
2004 Op. 184 Badger in the Bag
2004 Op. 185 Trombone Concerto written for Mark Eager World Premiere: Brecon with BBC National Orchestra of Wales Conductor Grant Llewellyn
2004 Op. 186 Bagatelles, for 4 trombones
2004 Op. 187 Concerto Grosso for brass band
2004 Op. 188 Sonata for piano duet
2005 Op. 189 La Serenissima: Images of Venice for soprano, baritone and orchestra
2006 Op. 190 Towy Landscape for soprano, baritone and piano (4 hands)
2007 Op. 192 Blake Songs, baritone and piano
Bells of Paradise
Divisions, Concertante for Horn Harpsichord & Strings
Guitar Sonata
In Praise of Music
Music for String Quartet, premiered by Sacconi Quartet on 11 March 2008 at Wigmore Hall
Prelude Nocturne And Dance for harp and strings
Rhapsody
On Welsh Tunes for orchestra
Roman Dream for soprano percussion harp and celesta
Scenes and Interludes, trumpet harpsichord and strings
Te Deum
Theatre Overture

References

Bibliography
 Craggs, Stewart R. 1993. Alun Hoddinott: A Bio-Bibliography. Bio-Bibliographies in Music, no. 44. Westport, Conn.: Greenwood Press. .
 Craggs, Stewart R. 2007. Alun Hoddinott: A Source Book. Aldershot, Hants, England; Burlington, VT: Ashgate. 
 Deane, Basil. 1978. Alun Hoddinott. Composers of Wales 2. [Cardiff]: University of Wales Press [for] the Welsh Arts Council. .
 Michael Kennedy (Editor): The Oxford Dictionary of Music (Oxford University Press, Oxford, 1994) 
 Lewis, Geraint. 2001. "Hoddinott, Alun". The New Grove Dictionary of Music and Musicians, second edition, edited by Stanley Sadie and John Tyrrell. London: Macmillan Publishers.
 McGovern, Una. 2002. Chambers Biographical Dictionary, seventh edition. Edinburgh: Chambers. 
 Matthew-Walker, Robert. 1993. Alun Hoddinott on Record: A Composer and the Gramophone. St. Austell : D. G. R. Books.

External links
 
 Alun Hoddinott at the Wales Video Gallery
 Obituary: Dr Alun Hoddinott, obituary in 4BarsRest
 Oriana Publications Publisher of Alun Hoddinott's works
 Oxford University Press Publisher of Alun Hoddinott's early works
 Interview with Alun Hoddinott, 24 June 1994
  Alun Hoddinott CBE - My Friend, a tribute by Christopher Painter

1929 births
2008 deaths
20th-century classical composers
21st-century classical composers
Alumni of Cardiff University
Commanders of the Order of the British Empire
British opera composers
Male opera composers
People educated at Gowerton Grammar School
People from Caerphilly County Borough
Welsh classical composers
Welsh male classical composers
20th-century British composers
20th-century British male musicians
21st-century British male musicians
21st-century British composers